The Autorité de Régulation des Communications Électroniques et de la Poste (ARCEP) is an independent agency in charge of regulating telecommunications and postal services in Niger.

External links

References 

Government  of Niger

Mass media regulation